The year 603 BC was a year of the pre-Julian Roman calendar. In the Roman Empire, it was known as year 151 Ab urbe condita. The denomination 601 BC for this year has been used since the early medieval period, when the Anno Domini calendar era became the prevalent method in Europe for naming years.

Events

Science and technology 
 In the second year of his reign, Nebuchadnezzar II proclaimed the intercalary month Ululu II, which begins on September 6. 
 In the Babylonian calendar, the Babylonian New Year of Nisannu 1 falls on January 14-15. March; the full moon in Nisannu on the 27th-28th March and the 1st Tašritu on the 6th-7th October.

Births

Deaths

References